John Whitney Walter (April 17, 1934 – January 5, 2018) was an American historian, engineer, businessperson, and politician, as well as a first cousin of former United States President Donald Trump. He worked for The Trump Organization and was the executive vice president of Trump Management, served as the historian of the Trump family, and was the 14th Mayor of Flower Hill, New York.

Early life, education, and military service 
John Walter was born in Queens on April 17, 1934, to William Walter and Elizabeth Trump Walter, the sister of Fred Trump.

As a child, Walter grew up in Hollis, Queens, until 1958, when the family moved to 511 Manhasset Woods Road in the Manhasset portion of Flower Hill, New York. He attended St. Paul's High School in Garden City, New York, along with Admiral Ballard Academy, located in Connecticut. Walter received his BS in Business Administration in 1955 from Norwich University, and earned his MBA from Columbia University in 1960.

Additionally, Walter served as a member of the U.S. Army for 2 years, in between undergraduate and graduate school. He was stationed in Heidelberg, Germany, and served as a second lieutenant.

Career 
John built a burglar alarm company, National Security Systems in Port Washington, New York, which both manufactured burglar alarm control panels and installed & serviced burglar alarm and access control systems in the NY metro area.

Later, Walter began working with his family in the Trump Organization, and was the executive vice president of Trump Management, Inc. During this time, Walter helped his family set up All County Building Supply and Maintenance - which he operated from his home at 511 Manhasset Woods Road; All County was founded in 1992. The Trumps used this company for the maintenance of a number of Trump-owned properties - including the Beach Haven apartment complex in Brooklyn. John Walter and the 4 Trump children each owned a 20% stake in All County; Walter also received a portion of the markup for his work creating the invoices. John Walter, an engineer, also designed communication systems for the Trump casinos in Atlantic City, New Jersey.

Walter was also the Trump family's historian, and managed much of the family's finances. Walter stored the family's financial records in his basement.

Additionally, Walter served as the president of the Flower Hill Association.

In 2020, Walter was mentioned in Mary L. Trump's book, "Too Much and Never Enough", as having helped his uncle, Fred Trump, with tax avoidance schemes.

Mayor of Flower Hill (1988–1996) 
In 1988, Walter was elected as the Mayor of Flower Hill, New York. He served in this capacity until 1996, when Derrick A. Rubin was elected as his successor. During his tenure, Walter was a key voice in the widening of Manhasset Woods Road, along with the rehabilitation of the Flower Hill Park, which at the time was owned by Nassau County.

Historian of Flower Hill (1996–2018) 
After serving as Flower Hill's mayor, Walter became the village's historian. He served in this capacity until his death, and was succeeded by Rhoda Becker.

Personal life 
Walter and his wife Joan had three daughters, Christine, Nancy, and Cynthia. Walter lived at 511 Manhasset Woods Road in Flower Hill, New York, with his family for the last 60 years of his life.

Death 
John Walter died on January 5, 2018, after a year-long cancer battle, at age 83. In April 2018, following his death, the Congregational Church of Manhasset held a memorial celebration in Walter's honor.

See also 

 Family of Donald Trump

References 

Donald
Flower Hill, New York
20th-century American engineers
20th-century American politicians
Mayors of places in New York (state)
Politicians from Queens, New York
20th-century American historians
American male non-fiction writers
Historians from New York (state)
Columbia Business School alumni
Norwich University alumni
21st-century American historians
21st-century American male writers
20th-century American male writers